Eddison is a given name and a surname. Notable people with the name include:
Alfred Eddison Hutton (1865–1947), British Liberal politician and manufacturer

Surname Eddison:
E. R. Eddison (1882–1945), English author
Nicole Eddison character in Robert Muchamore's CHERUB series of books
Robert Eddison, OBE (1908–1991), British actor, played the Grail Knight in Indiana Jones and the Last Crusade
Roger Eddison (1916–2000), Operations Researcher
William Eddison Dawson (1829–1902), English-born businessman and political figure on Prince Edward Island

First name Eddison:
Eddison Roberts (born 1959), Antiguan born former English cricketer
Eddison Zvobgo or Edson Zvobgo (1935–2004), founder of Zimbabwe's ruling party Zanu-PF

See also
Edison (disambiguation)
Edson (disambiguation)